The Scout and Guide movement in Bolivia is served by
 Asociación de Guías Scouts de Bolivia, member of the World Association of Girl Guides and Girl Scouts
 Asociación de Scouts de Bolivia, member of the World Organization of the Scout Movement

International Scout units in Bolivia
In addition, there are American Boy Scouts in La Paz, linked to the Direct Service branch of the Boy Scouts of America, which supports units around the world.

See also